J. Wesley Caradine (February 16, 1846 - ?) was a farmer and state legislator in Mississippi. He served in the Mississippi House of Representatives in 1874 and 1875. He was the first state representative for Clay County, Mississippi after it was established in 1871.

A Republican, he testified about threats and intimidation from Democrats during the 1875 election.

Celia Sanders was his wife.

See also
African-American officeholders during and following the Reconstruction era

References

African-American state legislators in Mississippi
Republican Party members of the Mississippi House of Representatives
African-American politicians during the Reconstruction Era
1846 births
Year of death missing
Farmers from Mississippi
African-American farmers
People from Clay County, Mississippi